Daniel Ashley Addo (born September 3, 1989) is a Ghanaian football player who plays as a defender for Indian club BSS Sporting Club.

Career

Club
Addo, who plays as defensive midfielder, began his professional career for Venomous Vipers then later joined Sekondi Hasaacas F.C. and signed after few months on 5 September 2008 for King Faisal Babes.
In October 2010, Addo joined Ashanti Gold, joining Ukrainian side FC Zorya Luhansk in 2011. In March 2013 Addo joined Kazakhstan Premier League club Kairat on loan, with a buyout clause, for the season from Zorya Luhansk. In February 2016, Addo signed for Ashanti Gold.

International
Addo was member of the Ghana national under-20 football team who won the 2009 FIFA U-20 World Cup in Egypt, in the final match against Brazil, Addo received the red card.

Honours

International
Ghana U-20
 FIFA U-20 World Cup Champion: 2009

References

External links

1989 births
Living people
Ghanaian footballers
Ghana under-20 international footballers
Ghanaian expatriate footballers
Expatriate footballers in Ukraine
Expatriate footballers in Kazakhstan
Ukrainian Premier League players
Kazakhstan Premier League players
King Faisal Babes FC players
FC Zorya Luhansk players
FC Kairat players
I-League players
Gokulam Kerala FC players
Association football defenders
Ghanaian expatriate sportspeople in Ukraine
Ghanaian expatriate sportspeople in Kazakhstan
Ghanaian expatriate sportspeople in India
Expatriate footballers in India
People from Cape Coast
Calcutta Football League players